Nikola Vukčević is a Montenegrin film director, born on 19 August 1974,  in Podgorica, SR Montenegro, Yugoslavia.  He is a stage and film director, independent producer since 1995, member of Film board of Montenegrin Academy of Sciences and Arts (CANU), and professor at national Faculty of Dramatic Arts – Cetinje. Also, artistic director at City theatre Podgorica, since 2004.

Biography

Vukcevic is the creative director of Podgorica City Theatre (2003-), professor of Film Directing module at the Department of Film Directing at the Montenegrin National Faculty of Drama Cetinje (FDU Cetinje). Also, Vukcevic is the youngest member ever to join the Film Board of the National Academy of Arts and Science (CANU).

Vukcevic worked as the director/ author in around 80 projects, including one feature film A View from the Eiffel Tower, presented at around 30 international festivals; for a selected list please see the attached factsheet), ten theatre performances, (performed and awarded at a number of important festivals, i.e. Budva Theatre City, Infant, Exit, TIBA, etc.) He also directed four short films, one TV film (shown on many festivals and televisions inside country and abroad), 25 half-an-hour documentaries for Montenegrin Broadcasting Service TV CG, as well as numerous music videos, commercials, TV clips.

(since 2004) - Vukcevic is at the position of artistic director of City Theatre Podgorica (second important theatre in state of Montenegro, after its National theatre), and artistic head of new productions, with more than 25 stage productions in charge (since 2003). Vukcevic is well versed in the use of modern cinematic technology, a skill he learned through collaboration with experienced production and postproduction crews (including Arkadena – Slovenia, Vizije – Croatia) as well as through attendance of international festivals, workshops and training sessions. Also, Vukcevic owns a majority in film company GALILEO PRODUCTION MONTENEGRO, which deals with film  &  video production, advertising, advertising, promotional films etc.

He has been awarded with many national and foreign awards. Nikola Vukcevic is married and a father of two children.

Vukcevic projects have been seen by a wide international audiences – in the last five years his films and plays have been performed/screened at more than 40 international film and theatre festivals. His work has earned him the status of one of the best known and respected theatre and film directors of his generation in Montenegro. He is also the youngest professor of film direction at a national Drama Faculty on the Balkans – a status that he specially covets.

Nikola Vukcevic has been named an Ambassador of Montenegrin Culture by the EU's Directorate General Enlargement. The Directorate is a project set up to promote the countries applying for membership of European Union, and the Ambassadors of culture will represent their country during the accession.

His next film project The Boys from Marksa I Engels Street is the winner of the 2nd award by the Ministry of Culture of Montenegro's programme for cinema 2010. The project has been awarded 60,000 Euro financial assistance.

Education

Vukcevic received a Bachelor of Arts in Film and Theatre Directing from the Academy of Arts Novi Sad, Yugoslavia, studying under supervision of internationally acclaimed film and theatre director Vlatko Gilic (films on Cannes film festival – 1973, 1977, 1980; Berlin, Oberhausen, Moscow, New York ...), as Student of Generation 1998 from Drama section, and he has finished his Faculty – one year before deadline. Vukcevic has been included in category of the best University students in Novi Sad. In June 2001 he received a master's degree of Arts in drama. His thesis was awarded and published as a book "I Influence of Film On Theatre of New Forms". Since November 2010 Vukcevic has PhD, on cinematic and theatre poetics of Ingmar Bergman.

A View from the Eiffel tower had a modest production budget of only 30 000 Euro. Its cast however included some of the most known actors from ex Yugoslavia who agreed to work on a voluntary basis or for very reduced fees. This was the first Montenegrin film after a fifteen-year break.  Also, A View from the Eiffel tower was the first co-production of companies from ex Yugoslavia, Montenegro, Croatia, Slovenia and Serbia.

References

1974 births
Living people
People from Podgorica
Montenegrin film directors